Afghanistan national rugby sevens team is an rugby sevens team that represents Afghanistan. The national team played their first international tournament at the 2018 Asian Games where they just missed out on qualifying through to the quarter finals.

History
Afghanistan's first appearance at an international tournament was the 2018 Asian Games held in Indonesia with a team that was full of Afghan expatriates. They would only record the one win in the tournament against the United Arab Emirates finishing ninth of the twelve teams competing. With the focus being on rugby sevens they competed in the trophy where the team seventh of eleven teams with a single win over Bangladesh.

Tournament history

Summer Olympics

Asian Games

References

Rugby union in Afghanistan
National rugby sevens teams
National sports teams of Afghanistan